Utricularia poconensis is a large suspended aquatic carnivorous plant that belongs to the genus Utricularia. U. poconensis is endemic to South America and is found in Brazil, Bolivia, and Argentina.

See also 
 List of Utricularia species

References 

Carnivorous plants of South America
Flora of Argentina
Flora of Brazil
Flora of Bolivia
poconensis